Turco may refer to:

 Turco (family), Medieval noble families from Asti and Verona, Italy
 Turco (surname), Italian surname
 Turco Municipality, Oruro, Bolivia
 Turco or tirailleur, a sharp shooter